Delhi Waveriders (DLW) is a field hockey franchise based in Delhi that plays in the Hockey India League. It is owned by The Wave Group. The captain of the team for HIL 2016 is Simon Child with Rupinder Pal Singh being the Vice-Captain of the team. Mr. Cedric Dsouza is the chief coach of the team for HIL 2016.

Franchisee Details

Ownership
The team is owned by Business house The Wave Group after the company bought the franchise on 17 September 2012. The group is involved in many businesses including sugar manufacturing, distilleries, paper manufacturing, real estate and multiplexes and retail management.

Wave Group is an over-40-year-old legacy, envisioned by founder-leader Kulwant Singh Chadha. The Chadha Group has been integrated by his three sons — Late Gurdeep Singh Chadha, Late Hardeep Singh Chadha, Rajinder Singh Chadha, and grandson Manpreet Singh Chadha (Monty Chadha). Starting with a sugar crusher in the state of Uttar Pradesh, the Group has progressively cast its footprint on to diverse business industries. John Abraham is the co-owner of Delhi Waveriders. He owns 13% share of the team.

2017 squad

Support Staff

Statistics

Fixtures and Results

2013

 Goals For: 41 (2.93 per match)
 Goals Against: 27 (1.93 per match)
 Most Goals: 7 (Overall: 4th)
 Rupinder Pal Singh

2014

 Goals For: 30 (2.50 per match)
 Goals Against: 17 (1.41 per match)
 Most Goals: 6 (Overall: 5th)
 Rupinder Pal Singh

2015

 Goals For: 21 (1.75 per match)
 Goals Against: 26 (2.16 per match)
 Most Goals: Akashdeep Singh (4), Simon Child (4)

2016

 Goals For: 38 (3.16 per match)
 Goals Against: 40 (3.33 per match)
 Most Goals: Rupinder Pal Singh (12)

Sponsors & Kit Manufacturers

References

 
Hockey India League teams
Sports clubs in Delhi
2012 establishments in Delhi
Indian field hockey clubs